Elections to Scarborough Borough Council were held on 1 May 2003.  The whole council was up for election with boundary changes since the last election in 1999 increasing the number of seats by one.  The Conservative party gained control of the council from no overall control.

Election result

|}

8 Conservative candidates were uncontested.

Ward results

External links
2003 Scarborough election result

2003
2003 English local elections
2000s in North Yorkshire